Kokanee Creek Provincial Park is a provincial park on the west shore of Kootenay Lake in the West Kootenay region of southeastern British Columbia.

Established as a BC Provincial Park in 1955, it encompasses 260 hectares of sandy beaches, deltas, and coniferous forest.

Kitto (or Kitto's, or Kittos) Landing was formerly at this location. Believed to be named after Henry Richard Kitto, who farmed the land from 1910, a government wharf existed by 1912. The Consolidated Mining and Smelting Co. hauled ore from its Molly Gibson mine to this landing. During the 1920s, the place fell into obscurity.

See also
Kokanee Glacier Provincial Park
Kokanee (disambiguation)

References

External links
West Kootenay EcoSociety - Kokanee Creek Visitor Centre

Provincial parks of British Columbia
West Kootenay
1955 establishments in British Columbia
Protected areas established in 1955